Stenolepta is a genus of ground beetles in the family Carabidae. There are at least three described species in Stenolepta.

Species
These three species belong to the genus Stenolepta:
 Stenolepta cylindrica Semenov, 1889  (Kazakhstan and Uzbekistan)
 Stenolepta gobettii Casale, 1988  (Afghanistan)
 Stenolepta transcaspica Semenov, 1889  (Iran and Turkmenistan)

References

Platyninae